Ice XV is a crystalline form of ice, the proton-ordered form of ice VI. It is created by cooling hydrochloric-acid-doped water to around 130 K at 1 GPa (9820 atm).

Ordinary water ice is known as ice Ih,  (in the Bridgman nomenclature).  Different types of ice, from ice II to ice XVI, have been created in the laboratory at different temperatures and pressures.

On 14 June 2009, Christoph Salzmann at the University of Oxford and colleagues reported having created ice XV and say that its properties differ significantly from those predicted. In particular, ice XV is antiferroelectric rather than ferroelectric as had been predicted.

References

Water ice